Fulle is a surname. Notable people with the surname include:

Adrian Fulle (born 1972), American writer, director, and producer
Jenny Fulle, American visual effects producer
Sebastian Fülle (born 1992), German basketball player
Siegfried Fülle (born 1939), German gymnast

See also
Fuller (surname)